Wang Yan (born 30 October 1999) is a senior elite Chinese gymnast. She won a bronze medal in the team event at the 2016 Summer Olympics.

2013 
Wang competed at the Chinese Nationals, placing fourth on balance beam, fifth with her team, and tenth in the all-around. She went on to compete at the National Games of China, placing fourth in the all-around and on vault, sixth on floor, and eighth with her team. She made her international debut at the Japan Junior International, winning silver in the all-around and on vault, bronze on beam, and placing fifth on uneven bars.

2014 
In April, she competed at the Junior Asian Championships in Tashkent, Uzbekistan, winning all-around gold, team and floor silver, and placing fourth on vault. At the Chinese Nationals in May, she won the gold medal on vault, as well as a bronze medal in the all-around and floor exercise. She placed seventh with her team. 
In August, she competed at the 2014 Youth Olympic Games in Nanjing. She placed fourth in the all around due to falls on the two events she qualified in first in, uneven bars and balance beam, but had strong vault and floor routines. She won a bronze on uneven bars, and golds on vault and balance beam.

Wang became a senior elite gymnast in 2015.

2015 
As a first year senior, Wang competed at the Chinese Nationals in June, qualifying first into the all-around and vault finals, in addition to the balance beam and floor finals. She was also third reserve for the uneven bars final. She earned silver in the all-around final behind Shang Chunsong.

2016 
Wang competed at the Chinese Nationals in May, qualifying third into the all-around, vault finals, and floor finals. She also qualified fourth into the balance beam finals.

She placed fourth in the all-around finals. In addition, she placed eighth in both balance beam and floor finals with major mistakes. At the conclusion of the Chinese Championships, Wang was named to the Chinese team for the 2016 Summer Olympics along with Shang Chunsong, Mao Yi, Fan Yilin, and Liu Tingting (who was replaced by Tan Jiaxin later due to an injury). She proved her placement on the team with some of the most solid routines of the team. In qualifying, she qualified 6th to the all around, and also qualified for vault and floor finals, the only gymnast on the team to qualify to multiple event finals. In the team final she helped the team win a bronze medal, behind Russia and the United States who won silver and gold respectively. In the all around final, she performed well again, placing 6th. In the vault final, she placed 5th. In the floor final, she performed well placing 5th. Over the course of the Olympic Games, she did not make any major mistakes on any event.

2021 
Wang competed at the 2021 Chinese Gymnastics Championship in Chengdu. In the qualification round, she competed on vault, balance beam, and floor exercise, finishing 84th all-around. Along with teammates Du Siyu, Lin Haibin, Qi Qi, Tang Xijing, and Wang Jingying, she helped Team Beijing to reach second place in the team final, securing a silver medal.

Selected Competitive Skills  

Notes:

Competitive history

References

External links 
Wang Yan at Fédération Internationale de Gymnastique

1999 births
Living people
Chinese female artistic gymnasts
Olympic gymnasts of China
Olympic medalists in gymnastics
Gymnasts at the 2016 Summer Olympics
2016 Olympic bronze medalists for China
Gymnasts at the 2014 Summer Youth Olympics
Medalists at the World Artistic Gymnastics Championships
Gymnasts from Beijing
Youth Olympic gold medalists for China
21st-century Chinese women